EWP may refer to
 East West Players
 Elevated work platform
 Elliott wave principle
 Emergency Watershed Program
 Engineered wood products
 England and Wales Precipitation, a set of monthly records dating back to the eighteenth century